Alizeh Iqbal Haider is a Pakistani politician, who had been a member of the National Assembly of Pakistan from 2013 to 2015.

Early life

She was born to Iqbal Haider.

She is barrister by profession and a human rights activist.

Political career

Haider was indirectly elected to the National Assembly of Pakistan as a candidate of Pakistan Peoples Party on a reserved seat for women in 2013 Pakistani general election.

She's served as spokesperson for Pakistan Peoples Party chairman Bilawal Bhutto Zardari.

In November 2015, she resigned from her National Assembly seat due to personal reasons.

References

Living people
Pakistan People's Party politicians
Pakistani MNAs 2013–2018
Politicians from Karachi
Pakistani human rights activists
Pakistani lawyers
Pakistani women lawyers
Women members of the National Assembly of Pakistan
Year of birth missing (living people)
21st-century Pakistani women politicians